The 1920 Cork Intermediate Hurling Championship was the 12th staging of the Cork Intermediate Hurling Championship since its establishment by the Cork County Board.

The championship was unfinished.

References

Cork Intermediate Hurling Championship
Cork Intermediate Hurling Championship